The 1941 Yale Bulldogs football team was an American football team that represented Yale University in the Ivy League during the 1941 college football season.  In their first and only season under head coach Spike Nelson, the Bulldogs compiled a 1–7 record and were outscored by a total of 136 to 54. The team played its home games at the Yale Bowl in New Haven, Connecticut.

Schedule

References

Yale
Yale Bulldogs football seasons
Yale Bulldogs football